The 1924 USC Trojans football team represented the University of Southern California (USC) in the 1924 college football season. In their sixth and final year under head coach Gus Henderson, the Trojans compiled a 9–2 record (2–1 against conference opponents), finished in fifth place in the Pacific Coast Conference, and out-scored their opponents by a combined total of 269 to 44.

Schedule

References

USC
USC Trojans football seasons
USC Trojans football